The AFL Coaches Association awards are a group of awards which have been presented annually since 2003, mainly to players and coaches in the Australian Football League (AFL), voted for by all AFL coaches.

Awards

Champion player of the year
Awarded annually since 2003. Each week, the senior coach of each AFL club gives five votes to the player they consider to be best on ground in the game in which their team plays, four to the second-best, and so on to one for the fifth-best. The player with the most votes at the end of the year wins. The award has different rules to many "best and fairest" awards, as player suspensions are disregarded.

Gary Ayres Award
Awarded since 2016. Each week during the finals series, the senior coach of each competing AFL club gives five votes to the player they consider to be best on ground in the game their team plays in, four to the second-best, and so on to one for the fifth-best. The player with the most votes at the end of the finals series wins.

Best young player
Awarded annually since 2003. Unlike some other "best young player" awards, there is no age or game limit. Awarded to the best player inside the first two seasons of their AFL careers based on the weekly AFLCA Player of the Year votes.

Allan Jeans Senior Coach of the Year Award
Awarded annually since 2003. At the end of the season, all AFL coaches give three votes to the senior coach they adjudge to have performed the best over that season, two to the second-best, and one to the third-best. The coach with the most votes wins. Ken Hinkley, Luke Beveridge, John Longmire, John Worsfold and Mark Thompson are the only coaches to have won the award more than once, with two each.

Assistant coach of the year
Awarded annually since 2003. At the end of the season, all AFL coaches and players rate their club's assistant coaches out of ten, with ten being the highest score. Assistant coaches' scores are then averaged, and the coach with the highest score wins.

Neale Daniher Lifetime Achievement Award
Awarded annually since 2003. In recognition of "an individual who has made an outstanding contribution" to Australian rules football. Renamed from Lifetime Achievement Award to Neale Daniher Lifetime Achievement Award in 2019.

Coaching Legend Award
Awarded annually from 2009 to 2018. Awarded to a former VFL/AFL coach who has achieved "significant achievement and success".

Media Award
Awarded annually since 2009. Awarded to an individual who displays "respected and insightful coverage of AFL football at the professional level". All AFL coaches can nominate an individual.

Career & Education Award
Awarded annually since 2012. Awarded to an AFL coach who has "shown exceptional commitment to their professional development".

Phil Walsh Memorial Scholarship
Awarded annually since 2016. Awarded to an AFL coach who is "committed to developing themselves via study and travel".

Support Staff Leadership Award
Awarded annually from 2003 to 2014. Awarded to an Australian rules support staff member who shows "outstanding contribution, innovation, [or] initiative in carrying out [their] duties".

All-Australian team
Awarded annually from 2015 to 2016. In 2015, in what was described as "ditching traditional positions in favour of modern tactics," in each position on the field (decided by analysts), the highest-scoring player from the Champion Player of the Year Award voting is chosen. In 2016, a more traditional team was apparently chosen.

2015 team

2016 team

AFLW champion player of the year
Awarded annually since 2018. Each week, the senior coach of each AFL Women's club gives five votes to the player they consider to be best on ground in the game in which their team plays, four to the second-best, and so on to one for the fifth-best. The player with the most votes at the end of the year wins. The award has different rules to many "best and fairest" awards, as player suspensions are disregarded.

AFLW Senior Coach of the Year Award
Awarded annually since 2019. After the preliminary finals, the senior coach of each AFL Women's club gives three votes to the other coach they consider to have performed best throughout the season, two to the second-best, and one to the third-best. The coach with the most votes from this process wins.

External links
 AFL Coaches Association awards homepage

References

Australian Football League awards
Australian rules football awards
Coaching awards
Australian sports coaching awards